Sydney Thomas Loudoun (1912-1973) was an Australian rugby league footballer who played in the 1930s.

Playing career
Sid Loudoun (sometimes mis-spelt 'Louden") started with the St. George club in the early 1930s. He spent some time at Mudgee before returning to the Saints before badly breaking his leg  during the 1934 season. He made a brief comeback 5 years later in 1939 before retiring.

Death
Louden died on 7 Jan 1973.

References

St. George Dragons players
1912 births
1973 deaths
Australian rugby league players
Rugby league halfbacks